Beyond the Space, Beyond the Time is the debut album by Polish power/heavy metal band Pathfinder. The album was co-produced by the sound engineer Mariusz Pietka and Pathfinder, and was originally released to Asian audiences through Radtone Records on April 14, 2010 and later, worldwide through Sonic Attack Records.

The band's first music video, for the song The Lord of Wolves, was released on 15 March 2011.

Track listing

 "Deep Into That Darkness Peering..." - 3:23
 "The Whisper of Ancient Rocks" - 5:53
 "Vita Reducta Through The Portal" - 1:00
 "Pathway to The Moon" - 6:52
 "All The Morning of The World" - 5:04
 "The Demon Awakens" - 6:10
 "Undiscovered Dreams" - 5:00
 "The Lord of Wolves" - 6:40
 "Sons of Immortal Fire" - 5:12
 "Stardust" - 8:30
 "Dance of Flames" - 1:02
 "To The Island of Immortal Fire" - 5:06
 "Beyond The Space, Beyond The Time" - 10:34
 "What If..." - 1:28
 "Forever Young (Alphaville Cover) (Japan Bonus Track)" - 5:34

Personnel

Pathfinder
Simon Kostro – lead vocals
Karol Mania – lead & rhythm guitars
Krzysztof Gunsen Elzanowski – lead & rhythm guitars
Kamil Ruth – drums
Bartosz Ogrodowicz – keyboards
Arkadiusz E. Ruth – bass

Guest musicians
Agatha Lejba-Migdalskiej – soprano
Michał Jelonek – violin

References

External links
 

2011 debut albums
Pathfinder (band) albums